Sunifred II (c. 898–948) was Count of Urgell. He was the son of Wilfred the Hairy of Urgell and succeeded his father on the latter's death in 897.  He was still ruling as late as 940, when he appears with his wife Adelaide.

Counts of Urgell
890s births
Year of birth uncertain
948 deaths
10th-century Catalan people
10th-century Visigothic people